HSwMS Äran (Swedish language: "Honour") was a Swedish first class coastal defence ship (Pansarskepp). She was used briefly during World War II in the Baltic sea, first in the Ålands eskader, and later in the Karlskrona eskader. This type of ship is commonly known as a coastal defence battleship. Having entered service on 7 September 1902, she was stricken on 13 June 1947. The hulk sank while under tow in 1968.

Notes

References
 Moore, J: Jane's Fighting Ships of World War I (1919; reprinted 1992) 

 

Äran-class coastal defence ships
Ships built in Gothenburg
1901 ships
Shipwrecks in the Kattegat
Shipwrecks of Sweden